Blair High School is a public high school in Pasadena, California, a part of the Pasadena Unified School District (PUSD).
Blair is an International Baccalaureate World School serving grades 6–12. Blair offers the International Baccalaureate (IB) Middle Years Programme and the IB Diploma Programme.

History
In 2017, Blair also added the IB career-related Programme, as part of Blair's Health Careers Academy. The school underwent a major academic overhaul beginning in the fall of 2003 as a result of sub-standard academic performance, which prompted a state review.  The school's two "co-principals" were replaced with a single principal, Rich Boccia (an administrative official with the Pasadena Unified School District, and district employee since 1980), who had been principal at South Pasadena Middle School. During Boccia's tenure, school wide academic performance rose sharply as a result of several academic reforms and in 2005 Boccia was named Secondary School Principal of the Year for the State of California for his leadership success at turning around Blair.

During the 2005–2006 school year, Blair was one of many PUSD schools threatened to be shut down due to budget cuts.  However, a strong showing of community support convinced the Pasadena school board to keep Blair open. Students, parents (both with enrolled children, and those considering Blair), and various local figures attended school board meetings in large numbers to support Blair. The parents and community also advocated strongly for the smaller, more manageable size of the campus, the then 7th–12th configuration (now 6–12) which allows for longer buy-in time for families and the fact that Blair is authorized to offer the IB Diploma Programme in addition to the Middle Year's Programme. Blair is the only PUSD secondary school located in the Southwest part of Pasadena.

Blair's "C" Campus was torn down in spring of 2005 with the intent to rebuild (it was deemed less expensive to rebuild than to renovate the existing building). The Measure Y bond monies earmarked for that project were subsequently depleted in overages at other PUSD sites. In November 2008, voters approved Measure TT bond monies, and Blair's "C" campus was rebuilt. The new building opened in 2011, and primarily houses the middle school program.

Blair West is located across the street from Pasadena Public Library's Allendale branch.
Renovation is underway on Blair's main building, the "A" building Blair West campus on the west side of Marengo Avenue. Construction is scheduled to be completed in December 2018. During construction, the main offices and high school classes are using the former Allendale Elementary school campus (1135 S. Euclid Avenue). The gymnasium and athletic facilities are located on Marengo Avenue. Construction is funded by Measure TT.

In addition to the International Baccalaureate Programme, Blair is known for its Health Careers Academy. The Health Careers Academy is the oldest of PUSD's College and Career Pathways, having been established in the early 1980s, and now offers the International Baccalaureate Career-related Programme. Blair offers PUSD's middle school and high school Spanish Dual Language Immersion program, and is also home to the district's International Academy (for newcomers to the country). PUSD offers an open enrollment process, and 80% of Blair's students attend Blair on permit. Over 100 students come from cities outside the PUSD attendance zone. The IB programme is cited by many of these non-PUSD families as the reason they chose Blair.

On February 6, 2019, the high school campus completed its $28.4 million renovation project. In a ceremony with the presence of the Mayor of Pasadena, Terry Tornek, the Superintendent of Schools, Dr. Brian McDonald, and current and former teachers and alumni. The three-floor classroom building will have 23 classrooms, an expanded office area, a remodeled library, a new main entrance and a new track and athletic field. This project was funded by the school district's voters during the November 2008 election (Measure TT), which is used to renovate all the school campuses within the Pasadena Unified School District.

Athletics
Blair's Middle School offers a variety of sports as part of the after-school LEARNS program with competitive teams in basketball, soccer and flag football.

In athletics, Blair has historically had a very competitive basketball program with the 2007–2008 Varsity girls team being named League Champions. The 2007–2008 Varsity Football team was co-league champions. The Blair boys basketball team took 2nd place in the league in 2016–17 and advanced to the championship game in CIF-Southern Section (Division 4AA). The track team has also been quite successful. Blair offers a variety of other sports as including soccer, track, swimming, softball, cross-country, volleyball, water polo and tennis. Blair uses John Muir High School for all football home games due to lack of lighting on their home field. Blair's football team had to cancel the remaining of the 2016 season for safety reasons because it did not have enough players. The school's football team now competes as an 8-man team after they notified the CIF-Southern Section to change its schedule. They compete for the first time as an 8-man team after 51 years of competing as an 11-man team. Blair also has an SRLA (Students Run LA) program. In 1969, Blair's football team, led by Coach Pete Yoder, went 13-0 and captured the school's only Southern Section Football Championship. The team featured future pros James McAlister, Kermit Alexander, Charles Phillips and Division I stars Forrie Martin and Eugene Jones. The storied season was highlighted with the Vikings 28–27 victory over La Puente's Bishop Amat—led by future USC greats - Pat Haden and J.K. McKay in a 4-A Division final at Mount San Antonio College. The following year, Bishop Amat beat Blair in the final. 
In 2022, Blair is dropping 8-man football after five seasons due to reduced student enrollment at the high school level. 

Sports offered
 Softball
 Volleyball
 Basketball 
 Soccer 
 Track and Field
 Cheer
 Water polo
 Swim

Notable alumni
 Michael Dorn (1971) - actor known for CHiPs and Star Trek: The Next Generation
 Bob Fisher, NFL player
 Jonathan Jackson attended 1968-1
 Kermit Johnson, football player
 Shelly Johnson 1977 - Cinematographer, Captain America: The First Avenger
 Megan Marshall, Pulitzer Prize winning author, 1971
 Gerardo Ortiz (2007) Pasadena based corridos singer, winner of Premio lo Nuestro for best new artist.
 John Singleton (1986) movie writer and director, credits include Boys n the Hood.
 Sean Smith (2005) Pasadena, California NFL Football Player CB for the Kansas City Chiefs
 Petra Verkaik (1984) - Playboy Playmate Miss December 1989. Known for the most appearances in Playboy of all time
 Khalyla Kuhn (1998-2002) Co-Host of Tigerbelly Podcast.

References

External links

Public middle schools in California
Middle schools in Los Angeles County, California
Public high schools in Los Angeles County, California
International Baccalaureate schools in California
Schools in Pasadena, California
1964 establishments in California